Guozhou may refer to:
Guó Prefecture (虢州), a prefecture between the 6th and 13th centuries in modern Henan, China
Guǒ Prefecture (果州), a prefecture between the 7th and 13th centuries in modern Sichuan, China
Later Zhou (951–960), a dynasty sometimes known as Guo Zhou (郭周).

See also
Ninepin Group, a group of islands in Hong Kong, also known as Guozhou Islands (果洲群島)
Guo (disambiguation)